Monmouth Township is a township in Jackson County, Iowa, USA.

History
Monmouth Township was established in 1843. The township was named in commemoration of the Battle of Monmouth in the American Revolutionary War.

References

Townships in Jackson County, Iowa
Townships in Iowa
1843 establishments in Iowa Territory